Claudia Tagbo (born 14 June 1973) is a French-Ivorian actress, comedian and TV personality.

Early life 
Claudia Tagbo was born in Abidjan, Ivory Coast in 1973.

Filmography

Theatre

References

External links

1973 births
Living people
21st-century French actresses
French people of Ivorian descent
Ivorian actresses
French film actresses
French television actresses
People from Abidjan